In medicine, a targetoid object is a structure or lesion that has the appearance of a target or is target-like.

Examples:
Target lesion
Targetoid hemosiderotic hemangioma
Targetoid Michaelis-Gutmann bodies
Targetoid calcification

External links
Targetoid Michaelis-Gutmann bodies - granuloma.homestead.com.
Targetoid nevus - pbase.com.

Dermatologic terminology
Oncology